is a mecha-anime television series directed by Kazuyoshi Katayama and animated by the Japanese animation studio Sunrise. The series follows Roger Smith, Paradigm City's top Negotiator.

The first season of the series premiered on October 13, 1999 on Wowow with the episode "Roger the Negotiator" and concluded with "R.D." on January 19, 2000. Starting on April 2, 2001, The Big O aired two times in its edited form on the Cartoon Network: once during the afternoon Toonami programming block at 5:30 PM, and once at 12:30 AM during Toonami: Midnight Run; the 12:30 AM showing was the premiere and the more publicized 5:30 PM showing a rerun. In anticipation of the premiere of The Big O: Season Two, the first thirteen episodes were re-aired, completely uncut, on the Adult Swim block.

Originally a 26-episode series, it was reduced to 13 episodes due to low ratings in Japan. However, positive international reception resulted in a second season co-produced by Cartoon Network, Sunrise, and Bandai Visual. The Big O: Season Two premiered on 2 January 2003 on Sun Television with the episode "Roger the Wanderer" and concluded with "The Show Must Go On" on March 27, 2003. The American premiere took place on Adult Swim on August 3, 2003. On October 26, the scheduled premiere of the final episode, "The Show Must Go On", was instead accidentally replaced by a rerun of episode 20, "Stripes". This resulted in the Adult Swim message boards being flooded with complaints by viewers. After an apology from Kim Manning, programming director for Adult Swim, the final episode was properly aired on November 2.

The first opening theme is the Queen-inspired "BIG-O!" Composed, arranged and performed by Rui Nagai. The second opening theme is "Respect," composed by Toshihiko Sahashi. The track is an homage to the music of Gerry Anderson's UFO, composed by Barry Gray. In 2007, Rui Nagai composed "Big-O! Show Must Go On," a 1960s hard rock piece, for Animax's reruns of the show. This opening was subsequently used in the 2007 North American DVD re-release of the series. The closing theme is "And Forever," written by Chie and composed by Ken Shima. The duet is performed by Robbie Danzie and Naoki Takao.

Episode list

Season 1 (1999–2000)

Season 2 (2003)

References

External links 
Official sites
 Episode listings at Bandai Channel (Arhicve) 

Episodes
Big O, The